Shurab-e Olya (also Romanized as Shūrāb-e ‘Olyā; also known as Shūrāb-e Bālā and Shūrāb-e Maʿdan Gach) is a village in Shurab Rural District, Veysian District, Dowreh County, Lorestan Province, Iran. At the 2006 census, its population was 149, in 34 families.

References 

Towns and villages in Dowreh County